Neoblastobasis is a genus of moths in the family Blastobasidae.

Species
Neoblastobasis biceratala (Park, 1984)
Neoblastobasis camelliae Chen & Wu, 2013
Neoblastobasis decolor (Meyrick, 1907)
Neoblastobasis eurotella Adamski, 2010
Neoblastobasis laikipiae Adamski, 2010
Neoblastobasis ligurica Nel & Varenne, 2004
Neoblastobasis perisella Adamski, 2010
Neoblastobasis songi Park, Kim & Byun, 2014
Neoblastobasis spiniharpella Kuznetzov & Sinev, 1985
Neoblastobasis wangithiae Adamski, 2010
Neoblastobasis ximeniaella Adamski, 2010

References

Blastobasidae genera